Nicole Hackett (born 10 December 1978 in Sydney) is an athlete from Australia, who competes in triathlon. She won the bronze medal at the 2002 Commonwealth Games however her greatest achievement is her son James born 4 June 2006

Hackett completed at the first Olympic triathlon at the 2000 Summer Olympics. She took ninth place with a total time of 2:03:10.81. Her split times were 19:41.08 for the swim, 1:05:37.10 for the cycling, and 0:37:52.63 for the run.

References 

1978 births
Living people
Australian female triathletes
Olympic triathletes of Australia
Triathletes at the 2000 Summer Olympics
Sportswomen from New South Wales
Commonwealth Games bronze medallists for Australia
Triathletes at the 2002 Commonwealth Games
Sportspeople from Sydney
Commonwealth Games medallists in triathlon
20th-century Australian women
21st-century Australian women
Medallists at the 2002 Commonwealth Games